Fagot may refer to:

 Fagot (surname)
 9K111 Fagot, a Soviet anti-tank missile system
 NATO report name for the Soviet Mikoyan-Gurevich MiG-15 turbojet fighter
 The name for the bassoon in Dutch, Spanish, German and Romanian

See also 
 Faggot (disambiguation)
 Fag (disambiguation)